Gideon Dreyfuss is an American biochemist who is the Isaac Norris Professor of Biochemistry and Biophysics at the University of Pennsylvania School of Medicine and an investigator of the Howard Hughes Medical Institute. He was elected to the National Academy of Sciences in 2012.

Dreyfuss received his Ph.D. in biological chemistry in 1978 from Harvard University and is a fellow of the American Academy of Arts and Sciences.

Research
The Dreyfuss Lab is interested in various projects studying the function and biogenesis of non-coding RNA and the proteins that interact with RNA. A primary research goal of the lab is to elucidate the function of Survival of Motor Neuron protein, SMN, which assembles a heptameric ring of Sm proteins on U snRNAs to form snRNPs that are essential components of the splicesome. Moreover, loss of functional SMN is directly linked to spinal muscular atrophy, a debilitating neurodegenerative disease that is characterize by the eventual death of motor neurons and muscular wasting. The Dreyfuss Lab is conducting research to understand the role of SMN in SMA pathology and using high throughput screening to discover potential therapeutics. The lab also studies the dynamic mechanism of RNA splicing, the RNA-binding proteins that determine exonic specificity, and snRNAs that are important regulators of splicing and mRNA maturation.

Genes or Gene Functions Discovered
 eIF4A3
 FXR1
 FXR2
 Gemin2 (Previously known as SIP1)
 Gemin3/DDX20
 Gemin4
 Gemin5
 Gemin6
 Gemin7
 hnRNPA1
 RA33
 hnRNPC
 PTBP1
 hnRNPK
 hnRNPM
 hnRNPR
 hnRNPU
 hnRNPQ
 Y14
 Magoh

See also
 SMN1
 SMN2
 Spinal muscular atrophy
 Heterogeneous ribonucleoprotein particle
 Spliceosome

References

External links
BMB: Gideon Dreyfuss
Howard Hughes Medical Institute
University of Pennsylvania CAMB: Gideon Dreyfuss
Dreyfuss Lab Website

American biochemists
Harvard Graduate School of Arts and Sciences alumni
Fellows of the American Academy of Arts and Sciences
Howard Hughes Medical Investigators
Year of birth missing (living people)
Living people
Members of the United States National Academy of Sciences
Hebrew University of Jerusalem alumni